Events in the year 1959 in Portugal.

Incumbents
President: Américo Tomás 
Prime Minister: António de Oliveira Salazar

Events
 29 December - Opening of the Lisbon Metro

Sport
In association football, for the first-tier league seasons, see 1958–59 Primeira Divisão and 1959–60 Primeira Divisão; for the Taça de Portugal seasons, see 1958–59 Taça de Portugal and 1959–60 Taça de Portugal. 
 21 March - International Cross Country Championships, in Lisbon
 19 July - Taça de Portugal Final
 23 August - Portuguese Grand Prix
Establishment of the Portuguese Women's Volleyball League.

References

 
Years of the 20th century in Portugal
Portugal